The Cortoons Gandia Animation Film Festival was created in 2000 and takes place in April in the town of Gandia, Spain. Initially occurring in Rome, the festival is an annual event. 

The festival is a competition between cartoon films of various techniques. There are a number of categories for entry: 
 International animated short film from 1 to 4 minutes
 International animated short film from 4 to 20 minutes
 Spanish animated short film
 Spanish animated short films produced in the Valencian Community
 Graduation animated film Cortoons Gandia at Festhome.com Retrieved 11 March 2019

See also
List of international animation festivals

External links
  Retrieved 11 March 2019
 Cortoons Gandia at Festhome Retrieved 11 March 2019
 Cortoons Gandia at filmfreeway.com Retrieved 11 March 2019

References

Animation film festivals
Film festivals in Spain
Student film festivals
Annual events in Spain